Helfgott is a surname. Notable people with the surname include:

Ben Helfgott (born 1930), British Holocaust survivor, and champion weightlifter
David Helfgott (born 1947), Australian concert pianist
Harald Helfgott (born 1977), Peruvian mathematician

See also 
Nathaniel Helfgot (born 1963), American rabbi
Yitzchak Meir Helfgot (born 1969), Jewish Cantor